Pak Chung Sham is a psychiatric geneticist. He holds the Suen Chi-Sun Professorship in Clinical Science at the University of Hong Kong, where he is also the Chair Professor in Psychiatric Genomics, Director of the Centre for Genomic Sciences, and Director of Academic Developments in the Department of Psychiatry. He was a Professor of Psychiatric and Statistical Genetics at the Institute of Psychiatry, Psychology and Neuroscience from 2000 to 2006. He first joined the faculty of the University of Hong Kong as a visiting professor in 2004, where he became Chair Professor in Psychiatric Genomics in 2006. He is the editor-in-chief of the peer-reviewed journal Human Heredity.

References

External links
Profile at HKU Scholars Hub

Living people
Hong Kong scientists
Academic staff of the University of Hong Kong
Chinese psychiatrists
Chinese geneticists
Alumni of the University of Cambridge
Alumni of the University of Oxford
Alumni of Birkbeck, University of London
Academics of King's College London
Academic journal editors
Psychiatric geneticists
Year of birth missing (living people)